Krivá is a village and municipality in Dolný Kubín District in the Žilina Region of northern Slovakia.

History
In historical records the village was first mentioned in 1575.

Geography
The municipality lies at an altitude of 545 metres and covers an area of 18.877 km². It has a population of about 819 people.

Notable people
 Blahoslavená Zdenka Cecília Schelingová

References

External links

 Krivá Local Website in Slovak

Villages and municipalities in Dolný Kubín District